The National Provincial Championship, or NPC, was the predecessor to the current ITM Cup, Air New Zealand Cup and Heartland Championship in New Zealand rugby. 2005 was the 30th and final year of the National Provincial Championship, Auckland were the winners of Division 1, Hawke's Bay were the winners of Division 2, while Wairarapa Bush were the winners of Division 3.

Standings

Division 1 Standings

Division 2 Standings

Division 3 Standings

Division 1 results

Round 1

Round 2

Round 3

Round 4

Round 5

Round 6

Round 7

Round 8

Round 9

Division 1 Semi-finals

Division 1 Grand Final

Division 2 results

Round 1

Bye:

Round 2

Bye:

Round 3

Bye:

Round 4

Bye:

Round 5

Bye:

Round 6

Bye:

Round 7

Bye:

Round 8

Bye:

Round 9

Bye:

Division 2 Semi-finals

Division 2 NPC Grand Final

References

 thesilverfern.co.nz(  2009-08-01)
 The 2006 New Zealand Rugby Almanack, Edited by Clive Akers and Geoff Miller

National Provincial Championship
2
National